Hussain Said (born 10 January 1977) is an Egyptian handball player. He competed in the men's tournament at the 2000 Summer Olympics.

References

1977 births
Living people
Egyptian male handball players
Olympic handball players of Egypt
Handball players at the 2000 Summer Olympics
Place of birth missing (living people)